William Campbell Legg (17 April 1948 – 8 August 2022) was an English professional footballer, who played for Huddersfield Town and Bradford Park Avenue.

Legg died on 8 August 2022, at the age of 74.

References

Sources

1948 births
2022 deaths
English footballers
Association football defenders
English Football League players
Huddersfield Town A.F.C. players
Bradford (Park Avenue) A.F.C. players
Footballers from Bradford